Martin Polák (born 1 November 1978) is a Czech cyclist. He competed in two events at the 2000 Summer Olympics.

References

1978 births
Living people
Czech male cyclists
Olympic cyclists of the Czech Republic
Cyclists at the 2000 Summer Olympics
Sportspeople from Brno